Eupithecia balintzsolti is a moth in the family Geometridae. It is found in Nepal, Laos and Thailand.

References

Moths described in 1987
balintzsolti
Moths of Asia